Yars' Revenge is a video game released for the Atari 2600 in 1982. It was created by Howard Scott Warshaw and is Atari's best-selling original game for the 2600.

Gameplay

The player controls an insect-like creature called a Yar who must nibble or shoot through a barrier in order to fire his Zorlon Cannon into the breach. The objective is to destroy the evil Qotile, which exists on the other side of the barrier. The Qotile can attack the Yar, even if the barrier is undamaged, by turning into the Swirl and shooting across the screen. In early levels the player is warned before the Swirl is fired and can retreat to a safe distance to dodge the attack, and in later levels, the Swirl turns into a guided missile after firing and will chase the Yar until it scrolls off either the top or the bottom of the screen. The Yar can hide from a pursuing destroyer missile within a "neutral zone" in the middle of the screen, but the Yar cannot shoot while in the zone. The Swirl can kill the Yar anywhere, even inside the neutral zone.

To destroy the Qotile or the Swirl, the player has to either touch the Qotile or eat a piece of the shield to activate the Zorlon Cannon, aim the cannon by leading with the Qotile or Swirl, then fire the cannon and fly the Yar out of the path of the cannon's shot. If the weapon finds its mark, the level ends. If the cannon blast hits a piece of the shield or misses, it is expended. The cannon itself is dangerous because, once activated, the fire button launches it instead of firing the Yar's usual shots and, as the cannon tracks the Yar's vertical position, players effectively use the Yar itself as a target and therefore must immediately maneuver to avoid being hit by their own shot.  The cannon shot can also rebound off the shield in later levels. An extra life is earned if the player shoots the Swirl in mid-air.

Easter egg

After killing the Swirl in mid-flight, a black vertical line appears on the screen across the spot where the Swirl was shot (the line is referred to in the manual as the "Ghost of Yars" and warns the player to stay off its "mean streak"). If the Yar is in the lower third of the screen and the black spot on its back across the vertical line at the moment the explosion vanishes, the game ends and goes into the "game select" screen with the programmer's initials, HSW, as HSWWSH in place of the player's score as an Easter egg.

Development

The game began as a licensed port of the Cinematronics arcade game Star Castle. Warshaw's original design for the Atari 2600 conversion was nearly identical to Star Castle: a powerful cannon is protected by three layers of counter-rotating shields. The player must shoot holes in these shields in order to destroy the cannon inside. But once these holes are made, the cannon can also shoot out at the player. If the outermost layer is completely destroyed, new layers of shields are grown. Three free-roaming mines hunt the player's ship.

However, as Warshaw realized the 2600's limitations would not allow for an accurate port of the game, he readapted the concept into a new game, preserving the "top logical and geometric components of Star Castle and reorganized them in a way that would better suit the machine". The reimagined game's working title was Time Freeze, because he wanted an action game where time would pause to feature the first full-screen explosion in a video game.

The final game story involves mutated houseflies defending their world against an alien attacker.  Warshaw "liked secret messages and hidden ideas" and thus inverted the name of Ray Kassar, then CEO of Atari, to become the titular Yar race and its planet Razak. This secret was hinted at by the forward-backward letters in the Easter egg. He wanted to call the game Yars' Revenge and so lied to one marketing employee that the CEO had approved the name. He then swore that employee to secrecy, assuming "This guy is going to run back and tell everyone."

Play testing by Atari found that the game was popular with women, in contrast to most space shooter games, which were not.

Release
As with several other video games for the 2600 system, a miniature comic book was included with Yars' Revenge to illustrate the story. The comic book explains the "revenge" of the game's title in terms of the Yars avenging the destruction of one of their worlds, Razak IV.

Atari also released an album, under the Kid Stuff Records label, which contains a theme song and a radio drama-style reading of an expansion of the story in the comic book.  A different 7" recording explains the tragedy, that a Yar could use himself to target the Zorlon Cannon rather than eating from the barrier. Both recordings were produced by John Braden.

Reception 

The original is now considered a classic, but received some mediocre reviews upon release. The October 1982 issue of Electronic Games stated, "The game has only one objective that must be repeated indefinitely. Today's players have grown used to progressive play, new challenges, and changing graphics. In this regard Yar is far too static."

The following year in the same magazine Bill Kunkel and Arnie Katz called Yars' Revenge a "video sleeping pill". In 1995, Flux magazine ranked Yars' Revenge 90th on its "Top 100 Video Games."

Legacy

Re-releases
In 1999, a Game Boy Color version was developed by Vatical Entertainment and released by Telegames.

A version was created in 2004 for the Atari Flashback system.

A 3-in-1 cartridge was released for the Game Boy Advance in 2005, published by DSI Games. This features Yars' Revenge, Pong, and Asteroids.

The original version of Yars' Revenge was published through Xbox's Game Room in 2010.

Remakes
A reimagining (titled Yar's Revenge, rather than Yars' Revenge) was released online on April 12, 2011 on Xbox Live Arcade and on April 28, 2011 for Microsoft Windows. It was developed by Killspace Entertainment and published by Atari. Yar has been reimagined as a humanoid female in mechanized power armor. It was positively reviewed by Popmatters, for visual appeal and good value. The Microsoft Windows port of the Xbox 360 version was panned by IGN, scoring a rating of only 5.5 out of 10.  It was considered to have little connection to the original game and to be too short even at the low price.

Another remake, a prequel to the original, Yars' Revenge: First War, was released as a part of the Atari GO initiative on April 8, 2011, on Facebook. It was developed by Teravision Games and published by Atari. This arcade social game has been acclaimed as remaining faithful to the original and still offering new innovative content. A revamped version of the game developed by Adamvision Studios and Sneakybox, titled Yars: Recharged, was released for Microsoft Windows, Nintendo Switch, PlayStation 4, PlayStation 5, Xbox One, Xbox Series X/S, Google Stadia, and Atari VCS on August 23, 2022 as part of Atari's Recharged series.

In 2012, Atari.com released another remake, for HTML5 web browsers as part of the Atari Arcade series in celebration of Atari's 40th anniversary.

Another remake of the game has been announced for release exclusively on the Intellivision Amico.

Sequels 
In 2005, a sequel to the original Yars' Revenge, titled Yars' Return, was released on the Atari Flashback 2.

In 2022, an unofficial fan sequel titled Goshawk was released for the Commodore 64. 

In December 2022, Warshaw announced he was returning to make a sequel with a release date of 2023 and set in the Yars training grounds.

References

External links
 Yars' Revenge at Atari Mania
 Yars' Revenge at AtariAge
 Yars' Revenge at TheAlmightyGuru
 
 Yars' Revenge Extra at the Internet Archive
 Original TV commercial

1982 video games
Atari 2600 games
Multidirectional shooters
Game Boy Color games
Video games about extraterrestrial life
Video games developed in the United States
Single-player video games
Atari games
Video games about insects
Video games adapted into comics
Video games designed by Howard Scott Warshaw